Robert Slippens (born 3 May 1975 in Opmeer, North Holland) is a Dutch racing cyclist.

Slippens represented the Netherlands at three different Summer Olympics. He made his Olympic debut at the 1996 Summer Olympics in Atlanta where he participated in the four kilometer team pursuit alongside Jarich Bakker, Richard Rozendaal and Peter Schep. The team finished in twelfth position. Four years later at the 2000 Summer Olympics in Sydney, he took part in the same event, but with different riders. Bakker and Rozendaal were replaced by Jens Mouris, John den Braber, and Wilco Zuijderwijk, while Schep and Slippens stayed. Although the team consisted of five riders, only four were allowed on the track at the same time. They qualified for the quarter finals, where they lost to the Ukrainian team, resulting in a seventh place overall.

In Sydney, Slippens also started at the madison, which he entered with his teammate Danny Stam. Together they have entered many Six Day Cycling Events in which they have ended up on the podium. They did not reach the podium at the Olympics but finished in eighth position. At the 2004 Summer Olympics in Athens, Stam and Slippens qualified for the madison again, but finished in fourteenth place, a lap behind the winners.

See also
 List of Dutch Olympic cyclists

External links
Slippens at the Dutch Olympic Archive

1975 births
Living people
People from Opmeer
Dutch male cyclists
Dutch track cyclists
Cyclists at the 1996 Summer Olympics
Cyclists at the 2000 Summer Olympics
Cyclists at the 2004 Summer Olympics
Cyclists at the 2008 Summer Olympics
Olympic cyclists of the Netherlands
Cyclists from North Holland
20th-century Dutch people
21st-century Dutch people